The Roland TR-808 Rhythm Composer, commonly known as the 808, is a drum machine manufactured by  Roland Corporation between 1980 and 1983. It was one of the first drum machines to allow users to program rhythms instead of using preset patterns. Unlike its nearest competitor at the time, the more expensive Linn LM-1, the 808 generates sounds using analog synthesis rather than by playing samples (prerecorded sounds).

Launched when electronic music had yet to become mainstream, the 808 received mixed reviews for its unrealistic drum sounds and was a commercial failure. After building approximately 12,000 units, Roland discontinued the 808 after its semiconductors became impossible to restock. It was succeeded by the TR-909 in 1983.

Over the course of the 1980s, the 808 attracted a cult following among underground musicians for its affordability on the used market, ease of use and idiosyncratic sounds, particularly its deep, booming bass drum. It became a cornerstone of the emerging electronic, dance, and hip hop genres, popularized by early hits such as "Planet Rock" by Afrika Bambaataa and the Soulsonic Force and "Sexual Healing" by Marvin Gaye.

The 808 was eventually used on more hit records than any other drum machine. Its popularity in hip hop has made it one of the most influential inventions in popular music, comparable to the Fender Stratocaster's impact on rock. Its sounds are included with music software and modern drum machines and it has inspired unlicensed recreations.

Development 

In the 1960s, drum machines were most often used to accompany home organs. They did not allow users to program rhythms, but instead offered preset patterns such as bossa nova. In 1969, the Hammond Organ Company hired the American musician and engineer Don Lewis to demonstrate its products, including an electronic organ with a built-in drum machine designed by the Japanese company Ace Tone. Lewis was known for performances using electronic instruments he had modified, decades before the popularization of instrument hacking via circuit bending. He made extensive modifications to the Ace Tone drum machine, creating his own rhythms and wiring it through his organ's expression pedal to accent the percussion.

Lewis was approached by Ikutaro Kakehashi, the president and founder of Ace Tone, who wanted to know how he had achieved the sounds using the Ace Tone machine. In 1972, Kakehashi formed the Roland Corporation and hired Lewis to help design drum machines. By the late 1970s, microprocessors were appearing in instruments such as the Roland MC-8 Microcomposer, and Kakehashi realized they could be used to program drum machines. In 1978, Roland released the CompuRhythm CR-78, the first drum machine with which users could write, save and replay their own patterns.

With its next machine, the TR-808, Roland aimed to develop a drum machine for the professional market, expecting that it would mainly be used to create demos. The engineers conceived a "drum synthesizer" with which users could program drum sequences and edit parameters such as tuning, decay and level. Though they aimed to emulate real percussion, the prohibitive cost of memory drove them to design sound-generating hardware instead of using samples (prerecorded sounds). Kakehashi purchased faulty transistors to create the 808's distinctive sizzling sound. The chief engineer, Makoto Muroi, credited the 808 voice circuit design to "Mr. Nakamura" and the software to "Mr. Matsuoka".

Sounds and features 

The 808 imitates acoustic percussion: the bass drum, snare, toms, conga, rimshot, claves, handclap, maraca, cowbell, cymbal and hi-hat (open and closed). Rather than playing samples, it generates sounds using analog synthesis; the TR in TR-808 stands for "transistor rhythm". The sounds do not resemble real percussion, and have been described as "clicky", "robotic", "spacey", "toy-like" and "futuristic". Fact described them as a combination of synthesizer tones and white noise that resemble "bursts coming from the BBC Radiophonic Workshop" more than a real drum kit.

The 808 is noted for its powerful bass drum sound, built from a sine oscillator, low-pass filter and voltage-controlled amplifier. The bass drum decay control allows users to lengthen the sound, creating uniquely low frequencies that flatten slightly over time, possibly not by design. The New Yorker described the bass drum as the 808's defining feature.

The 808 was the first drum machine with which users could program a percussion track from beginning to end, complete with breaks and rolls. Users can program up to 32 patterns using the step sequencer, chain up to 768 measures and place accents on individual beats. The 808 includes volume knobs for each voice, numerous audio outputs and a DIN sync port (a precursor to MIDI) to synchronize with other devices. Its three trigger outputs can synchronize with synthesizers and other equipment.

Release 
Roland marketed it as an affordable alternative to the Linn LM-1, manufactured by Linn Electronics, which used samples of real drum kits. The 808 sounded simplistic and synthetic by comparison; electronic music had yet to become mainstream and many musicians and producers wanted realistic-sounding drum machines. According to many reports, one review dismissed the 808 as sounding like "marching anteaters", though this likely referred to machines that predated it. Contemporary Keyboard wrote a positive review, predicting that it would become "the standard for rhythm machines of the future".

Despite some early adopters, the 808 was a commercial failure and fewer than 12,000 units were sold. Roland ended production in 1983 after semiconductor improvements made it impossible to restock the faulty transistors essential to its design.

Influence 
Though the 808 was unsuccessful, it was eventually used on more hit records than any other drum machine and became one of the most influential inventions in popular music. By the time Roland discontinued it in 1983, it had become common on the used market, often selling for less than $100. Its ease of use, affordability and idiosyncratic sound earned it a cult following among underground musicians and producers, and it became a cornerstone of the developing electronic and hip hop genres.

CBC News credited the first use of the 808 to the Japanese electronic group Yellow Magic Orchestra. The first records to feature the 808 were released in 1981: Yellow Magic Orchestra's BGM and the Monitors' "Nobody Told Me". In 1982, the American R&B artist Marvin Gaye released the first hit single that featured the 808, "Sexual Healing". Gaye was drawn to 808 because he could use it to create music without other musicians or producers.

808 samples are common in music software, and it has inspired numerous unlicensed clones. Flavorwire wrote that the 808 is now so ubiquitous that "its beats are almost a language of their own", with sounds recognizable even to listeners who do not know what drum machines are, and so "you also notice when somebody messes with them or uses them in unusual contexts". In 2019, DJMag wrote that it was likely the most used drum machine of the preceding 40 years.

Hip hop 
The 808 has been described as hip hop's equivalent to the Fender Stratocaster guitar, which dramatically influenced the development of rock music. It was used by pioneering hip hop acts including Run-DMC, LL Cool J and Public Enemy. The 808 bass drum, in particular, became so essential that Hank Shocklee of the Bomb Squad production group declared that "it's not hip hop without that sound". The New Yorker wrote that the "trembling feeling of [the 808 bass drum], booming down boulevards in Oakland, the Bronx and Detroit, are part of America's cultural DNA". Even after the 808 fell out of use by East Coast hip hop producers in the 1990s, it remained a staple of Southern hip hop. 

The rapper Kanye West used the 808 on every track on his 2008 solo album 808s & Heartbreak, which Slate described as "an explicit love letter to the device". The New Yorker wrote in 2015 that the 808 was the bedrock of the modern "urban-youth-culture soundtrack", particularly in trap music, and had influenced a new blend of dance and retro hip hop that "embraces and fetishizes ... street music from the past".

Artists pushed the limits of the 808's limited pattern storage; according to Slate, "Those eight-bar units became veritable playgrounds for invention and creativity." Artists manipulated the bass drum to produce new sounds, such as on the 1984 single "Set it Off", in which the producer Strafe used it to imitate the sound of an underground nuclear test. The producer Rick Rubin popularized the technique of lengthening the bass drum decay and tuning it to different pitches to create basslines. The Beastie Boys used a reversed recording of an 808 on their 1986 track "Paul Revere".

Electronic music 
In 1982, Afrika Bambaataa and the Soulsonic Force released their single "Planet Rock", which used the 808 to create "strange, futuristic" percussion that was popular in clubs. The track influenced the development of electronic and hip hop music and subgenres including Miami bass and Detroit techno, and popularized the 808 as a "fundamental element of futuristic sound". According to Slate, "Planet Rock" "didn't so much put the 808 on the map so much as reorient an entire world of post-disco dance music around it".

In the UK, the 808 was popularized by the electronic group 808 State, which took its name from the 808 and used it extensively. 808 State's Graham Massey said: "The Roland gear began to be a kind of Esperanto in music. The whole world began to be less separated through this technology, and there was a classiness to it—you could transcend your provincial music with this equipment." With the rise of rave culture, a precursor to acid house, the 808 became a staple sound on British radio.

Pop 
The 808 was used extensively in pop. The New Yorker wrote that the it triggered "the big bang of pop's great age of disruption, from 1983 to 1986", and that its "defiantly inorganic timbres ... sketched out the domain of a new world of music". According to Slate, it was instrumental in pop music's shift from conventional structure and harmonic progression to "thinking in terms of sequences, discrete passages of sound and time to be repeated and revised ad infinitum".

The Argentine artist Charly García used the 808 for all percussion on his second album, Clics modernos (1983). In the 1984 Talking Heads concert film Stop Making Sense, the singer David Byrne performs "Psycho Killer" accompanied by an 808, stumbling against its "gunshot"-like sounds. The drummer and songwriter Phil Collins found the 808 useful for looping rhythms for long periods, as human drummers would be tempted to add variations and fills. Whitney Houston's 1987 single "I Wanna Dance With Somebody (Who Loves Me)" makes extensive use of the 808.  

Other artists who have used the 808 include Bassnectar, Damon Albarn, Diplo, Fatboy Slim, David Guetta and New Order. It has been referenced in lyrics by artists including the Beastie Boys, Beck, Outkast, Kelis, TI, Lil Wayne, Britney Spears, Beyoncé, R Kelly and Robbie Williams. Its bass drum has been used as a metaphor for a heartbeat in songs by artists including Madonna, Rihanna and Kesha.

Successors 

The 808 was followed in 1983 by the TR-909, the first Roland drum machine to use samples. Like the 808, the 909 was influential on popular music, influencing genres such as techno, house and acid.

808 samples were included in ReBirth RB-338, an early software synthesiser developed by Propellerhead Software. According to Andy Jones of MusicTech, ReBirth was "especially incredible" as the first software emulation of 808 sounds. It was retired in 2017 as Roland said it infringed on its intellectual property. Roland has included 808 samples in several drum machines, including its Grooveboxes in the 1990s. Its TR-8 and TR-8S drum machines, released in the 2010s, recreate the sounds electronically rather than through sample playback. 

In 2017, Roland released the TR-08, a miniaturized 808 featuring an LED display, MIDI and USB connections, expanded sequencer control and a built-in speaker. Roland released the first official software emulations of the 808 and 909 in 2018. In 2019, Behringer released a recreation of the 808, the Behringer RD-8 Rhythm Designer. Unlike Roland's TR-08 and TR-8S, which use samples and virtual synthesis to recreate the 808 sounds, the RD-8 uses analog circuitry.

See also
 808 (film) – 2015 documentary about the Roland TR-808

References

Further reading

External links 
 Official Roland site
 In-browser emulation of the 808
 Pattern for 808 Drum Machines
 Roland TR808 – Sound On Sound retrospective

1980 musical instruments
Musical instruments invented in the 1980s
Drum machines
Grooveboxes
TR-808
TR-808
Hip hop production